The South African national cricket team toured New Zealand in February and March 1995 and played a single Test match against the hosts to celebrate the centenary of the New Zealand Cricket Council, as well as a pair of tour games. The tour was the South African team's first to New Zealand since 1964, and their seventh overseas tour since their readmission to the International Cricket Council in 1991. South Africa won the single Test match by 93 runs.

Background
New Zealand and South Africa had only recently played each other, as New Zealand team's tour during the 1994–95 period had been to South Africa, where they had played a three-match Test series against the hosts, as well as a quadrangular one-day tournament also involving Pakistan and Sri Lanka. For South Africa, this was their only tour of the period, having also played a home Test against Pakistan.

Squads

New Zealand
Ken Rutherford (c), Darrin Murray, Bryan Young, Martin Crowe, Mark Greatbatch, Stephen Fleming, Shane Thomson, Adam Parore, Matthew Hart, Gavin Larsen, Dion Nash, Danny Morrison

South Africa
Hansie Cronje (capt), Gary Kirsten, Andrew Hudson, Rudi Steyn, Daryl Cullinan, Michael Rindel, Jonty Rhodes, D.J.Callaghan, Steven Jack, Dave Richardson, Pat Symcox, Craig Matthews, E.O.Simons, C.E.Eksteen, Fanie de Villiers, Allan Donald

Matches

Tour matches

Wellington v South Africans

New Zealand Academy XI v South Africans

Test match

References

External links

1995 in South African cricket
1995 in New Zealand cricket
International cricket competitions from 1994–95 to 1997
New Zealand cricket seasons from 1970–71 to 1999–2000
1995